(Devnagari: द्रव्यसंग्रह) (Compendium of substances) is a 10th-century Jain text in Jain Sauraseni Prakrit by Acharya Nemicandra belonging to the Digambara Jain tradition. It is a composition of 58 gathas (verses) giving an exposition of the six dravyas (substances) that characterize the Jain view of the world: sentient (jīva), non-sentient (pudgala), principle of motion (dharma), principle of rest (adharma), space (ākāśa) and time (kāla). It is one of the most important Jain works and has gained widespread popularity.  has played an important role in Jain education and is often memorized because of its comprehensiveness as well as brevity.

Author

He was the teacher of Camundaraya—the general of the Western Ganga Dynasty of Karnataka. Nemicandra was a prolific author and a specialist in summarizing and giving lucidly the essence of teachings in various fields;  (compendium) and sāras (essence) were his specialty. He is said to have inspired Camundaraya to build the famous Bāhubali statue at Shravanabelagola. Vahuvali Charitra (a Jain work based on collection of traditions) notes that Nemicandra belonged to the monastic order of Desiya gana. After establishing the statue of Bāhubali, Camundaraya offered villages yielding a revenue of 96,000 gold coins to Nemicandra for daily worship of and festivals for Gommatesvara (Lord Bāhubali).

Influence

 has played an important role in Jain education and is often memorized because of its comprehensiveness and brevity.

Contents and overview
In its 58 verses, the author makes skillful use of āryā metre. Nemicandra's presentation is often articulated around the opposition between the conventional and the absolute points of view (vyavahāra and niścaya-naya), or around the contrast between the material and the spiritual angles (dravya and bhāva).

The six dravyas

In tine opening verse, along with the usual mangalacharana (eulogy), it is mentioned that dravya consists of jiva and ajiva. In the second verse Jiva is defined:
The various characteristics of Jiva mentioned in the definition are taken up one by one in verses 3–14.  classifies the embodied souls on the basis of the number of senses possessed by it: from one to five senses. After this detailed description of Jivas the author proceeds to describe Ajivas—Pudgala, Dharma, adharma, Akasa and Kala, each of which is defined in verses 16–22.
Among these, as per verse 23, the Jiva, pudgala, dharma, adharma, and akasa are called astikayas, the extensibles or conglomerates.

Tattvas

The second part deals with the seven tattvas (fundamental principles or verities): jīva (soul), ajīva (non soul), āsrava (karmic inflow), bandha (bondage of karmas), saṃvara (stoppage of karmas), nirjarā (shedding of karmas) and mokṣa  (emancipation or liberation). Together with puṇya (merit or beneficial karma) and pāpa (demerit or harmful karma) they form nine padārtha. Some call all nine as navatattava or nine tattvas.

Moksa 

The third part of  begins with verse 39 describing the means to attain liberation from conventional and real point of views. The three jewels of Jainism also known as Ratnatraya—Samyak darśana (rational perception), samyak jñāna (rational knowledge) and samyak cāritra (rational conduct)—which are essential in achieving liberation—are defined and the importance of dhyāna (meditation) is emphasized. On meditation, Nemicandra says:

Pañca-Parameṣṭhi 

Verses 49 to 54 of the Dravyasaṃgraha, succinctly characterizes the five Supreme Beings (Pañca-Parameṣṭhi) and their characteristics.

Commentaries
Other commentaries on the work include: 
Balacandra (1142) – Tika on Nemicandra's Dravyasamgraha
Mallisena (1292) – Commentary on Nemicandra Siddhantin's Dravyasamgraha
Brahmadeva (1300) – Vrtti on Nemicandra's Dravyasamgraha
Hamsaraja (1750) – Commentary on Nemicandra's Dravyasamgraha.
Ramacandra – Commentary on Nemicandra's Dravyasamgraha.

See also
Jain Agamas
Jainism
List of Jain texts

Notes

References

 

Prakrit Jain texts
Jain texts